Mats Nordberg (14 April 1958 – 15 January 2023) was a Swedish politician and member of the Riksdag representing the Sweden Democrats party for the constituency of Dalarna County. Nordberg also worked as a tree surgeon and in forestry. He served on Committee on the Environment, Public Health and Consumer Policy in the Swedish parliament.

Nordberg died in office on 15 January 2023, at the age of 64 after a period of illness. His Riksdag seat was taken over by Daniel  Lönn and later Rasmus Giertz.

References 

1958 births
2023 deaths
21st-century Swedish politicians
Members of the Riksdag 2018–2022
Members of the Riksdag from the Sweden Democrats
Members of the Riksdag 2022–2026
People from Falun